Iranian Mental Health Research Network (MHRN) is a network of related research centers founded in 2006 in Iran. The network is supervised by the Iranian Deputy of Research and Technology of the Ministry of Health. Currently it includes 23 centers active in the field of mental health research. The network aims to promote high quality research in this field, especially applied research and Health System Research. Developing the databases of published articles in Persian (Iranpsych) and other useful databases for Iranian researchers (including researchers and psychological assessment tools) is one of the primary goals of the network. Director of the Iranian MHRN is Mohammadreza Mohammadi, a child and adolescent psychiatrist. His first director was Jafar Bolhari, a psychiatrist and the former director of Tehran Institute of Psychiatry.

External links 
 

Medical research institutes in Iran
Mental health in Iran
Psychiatric research institutes
Medical and health organisations based in Iran